Güneyli is a village in Erdemli district of Mersin Province, Turkey. It is situated in the high plateau of Toros Mountains. Although there are forests around the village, the treeline of the Taurus Mountains is to the north of the village and the north of this line is devoid of forests. The population of Güneyli was 299  as of 2012. There are ruins of Roman buildings around the village and it is reported that some ancient water wells are still in use.

There is no document showing the founding date of the village, but the villagers are of Turkmen origin, and they tend to keep their traditional life styles. The main economic activities are animal breeding and farming. Cereals, tomatoes, and beans are the main products of the village. Fruit production is a relatively recent activity. Women in the village also weave rugs.

References

Villages in Erdemli District